The 1962–63 La Liga was the 32nd season since its establishment. The season started on September 16, 1962, and finished on April 21, 1963.

Team locations

League table

Results

Relegation play-offs 
Español won their series against Mallorca after a tie-break match where Catalans won by 1–0.

|}

Pichichi Trophy

External links 
  Official LFP Site

1962 1963
1962–63 in Spanish football leagues
Spain